Mount Myhon, is a  mountain in the Miscinchinka Ranges of the Hart Ranges in the Northern Rocky Mountains.

The mountain is named after Canadian Army Private James Stanley Myhon, K2333, enlisted at Prince George; serving with the 3rd Canadian Division, 7th Infantry Brigade , Canadian Scottish Regiment.  Private Myhon was killed in action 28 October 1944, age 19 during Operation Switchback, a component of the Battle of the Scheldt. He is buried at Adegem Canadian War Cemetery, Belgium, grave VII.B.7.

References 

Myhon
Northern Interior of British Columbia
Canadian Rockies
Cariboo Land District